The Pennsylvania-Reading Seashore Lines was a railroad that operated in South Jersey in the 20th century. It was created in 1933 as a joint consolidation venture between two competing railroads in the region: the Pennsylvania Railroad and the Reading Company.

History 
In the early 20th century, Atlantic City and the southern New Jersey seashore were major seaside vacation destinations for the Philadelphia area's wealthy and working class populations. The popularity of "South Jersey"'s seashore was made possible by rail transport which provided inexpensive and fast service between the Philadelphia area's population centers and shore points.

There were two competing railroad companies connecting Camden and, by ferry, Philadelphia, with the South Jersey seashore.
Competition was fierce and by its height in the 1920s competition between the West Jersey and Seashore Railroad (WJ&S), owned by the Pennsylvania Railroad, and the Atlantic City Railroad, owned by the Philadelphia and Reading Railway, was so intense that at one time both lines boasted some of the fastest trains in the world.
Trains often raced one another so as to be the first to arrive at their destination. Racing was encouraged by the fact that in many areas, the two lines were only several hundred feet apart. On the Cape May lines, the trains were in sight of each other for 11 miles between Cape May Court House and Cape May. Over the last 5 miles into Cape May, the tracks were only 50 feet apart.

On July 1, 1926, the Benjamin Franklin Bridge opened, spanning the Delaware River, connecting Philadelphia and Camden. Car, truck, and bus usage increased as the state built roads in the 1920s and 30s next to the railroads going from Camden to the shore, cutting into profits.

On March 4, 1931, the New Jersey Board of Public Utilities (BPU) ordered the two companies to join their southern New Jersey lines into one company. The Consolidation Agreement decreed that the Pennsylvania Railroad had two-thirds ownership, and the Reading Company had one-third ownership. 

But the post-World War II rise of the automobile and the Atlantic City Expressway, built in the 1960s, along with the increase in air travel, not only caused people to abandon the railroad for their cars, but also to abandon Atlantic City for more exotic vacation destinations, such as Florida. By the late 1960s, the surviving former Camden and Atlantic City Main Line was reduced to a commuter service funded by the New Jersey Department of Transportation (NJDOT) running trains of Budd RDC railcars operating from a small terminal at Lindenwold PATCO station and Atlantic City.

While the P-RSL did not enter bankruptcy, its owners, the Penn Central, successor to the Pennsylvania, did. The Reading filed bankruptcy a few years after the Penn Central.  As a result, Conrail took over the P-RSL on April 1, 1976.

Predecessors

West Jersey and Seashore Railroad
Effective May 4, 1896, the Pennsylvania Railroad consolidated all of its railroads and several smaller properties in Southern New Jersey into the West Jersey and Seashore Railroad. The WJ&S had lines coming from its Federal Street Terminal in Camden.

The "Main Line" ran to Atlantic City and to other shore points via Winslow Junction, and its line via Woodbury to Millville. It was electrified with 650 volt DC third rail and overhead lines, with branches going to Salem, and Deep Water Point from Woodbury, and Bridgeton from Glassboro.

While the WJ&S line via Woodbury was a pioneering example of railroad electrification, electric multiple unit (MU) service between Newfield and Atlantic City ended September 26, 1931. The PRSL only inherited the electrified Millville–Camden commuter rail service from WJ&S.

Atlantic City Railroad

Effective April 1, 1889, the Philadelphia and Reading Railway consolidated all of its railroads in Southern New Jersey into the Atlantic City Railroad (ACRR).

The ACRR, a subsidiary of the Reading Company, had one line from its Kaighn's Point Terminal going to Winslow Junction with lines splitting off to Atlantic City, Ocean City, Wildwood, and Cape May. Branch lines included the Gloucester Branch to Grenloch, and the Willamstown Branch from Willamstown Junction (on the Atlantic City Main) to Mullica Hill to the south, and Atco to the north.

On 15 July 1933, The WJ&S was leased by the ACRR, and changed its name to Pennsylvania-Reading Seashore Lines, as the Consolidation Agreement had decreed.

Equipment

Steam

The 21 steam locomotives owned by the PRSL were from the PRR subsidiary WJ&S. They all consisted of PRR classes. Before dieselization the PRSL was more apt to lease its motive power from either of its parent railroads as it completely lacked any heavy passenger locomotives (like 4-6-2 Pacifics). As its parent railroads began to replace steam with diesel locomotives, the PRSL became a haven for steam locomotives during their final years of operation.

Class B: 0-6-0 
The 0-6-0 type was assigned class B, and was used in switcher service.
 B-6sb
 B8

Class E: 4-4-2
The 4-4-2 "Atlantic" type was assigned class E. and was used in passenger service.
 E-3sb
 E6s

Class G: 4-6-0
The 4-6-0 "Ten-Wheeler" type was assigned class G. and was used in passenger service.
 G5s

Class H: 2-8-0 
The 2-8-0 "Consolidation" type was assigned class H, and was used in freight service.
 H-6sb
 H9s
 H10s

Class K: 4-6-2
The 4-6-2 "Pacific" type was assigned class K. and was used in passenger service.
 K4s

Since the Consolidation Agreement had decreed that the PRR Mechanical Department would oversee equipment policy decisions, the PRSL did not gain ownership of any ACRR-RDG locomotives.

Additional locomotives were leased as needed from PRSL's parent companies, PRR and RDG.

Diesel

Beginning in the 1950s the PRSL purchased a rather modest fleet of its own diesel locomotives to replace its steam engines for passenger and freight services. When additional power was needed for the busy summer tourist season engines were borrowed from the parent corporations (usually the PRR) as was true previously with the steam locomotives. To further supplement its small fleet the PRSL made increasing use of run through power on certain freight trains to large customers that did not require classification at the PRSL's Pavonia yard.

The first generation of PRSL diesel locomotives were all from the nearby Baldwin Locomotive Works, which was the vendor of choice for the parent PRR in both the steam and early diesel era.
The PRSL's diesel locomotives were almost all painted in what is commonly referred to as Brunswick Green which was so dark it seemed almost black. The paint scheme was borrowed from its PRR parent and with the company's official name for this color being DGLE (Dark Green Locomotive Enamel). The undercarriage of the locomotives were painted in black referred to as "True Black."

Baldwin Locomotive Works
By the late 1960s, the original Baldwin diesels were beginning to suffer reliability problems, which was exacerbated by the fact that Baldwin had gone out of business some 10 years before and could no longer provide spare parts or maintenance. With the new powerplant being constructed at Beesley's Point ready to consume several 90 car coal trains per week the PRSL was in need of more powerful and more reliable locomotives and turned to industry-leader EMD to supply 10 new second generation diesel electric locomotives.

General Motors Electro-Motive Division (GM-EMD)

Passenger

Gas-electric car (Doodlebug)

RDC
PRSL inherited the following from the WJ&S: 
71 PRR-Type P-70 passenger cars No.'s 9865-9936 (steel, 44 seats)
21 PRR-Type PB-70 passenger-combines Cars No.'s 9938-9958 (steel, 40 seats) 9959-9962 (steel, 40 seats)
17 various PRR-Type mail and baggage cars No.'s 25 (steel underfame), 6403 (steel), 6428-6438 (steel), 9963-9966 (steel)

Additional passenger cars were leased as needed from PRSL's parent companies, PRR and RDG, and sometimes from the Central Railroad of New Jersey (CNJ).

The PRSL did not own any of the P70s that carried its name. They were leased from the WJ&S. The passenger cars of the PRSL were painted Tuscan Red. This is a brick-colored shade of red.

Cabooses

Successor railroads 
Cape May Seashore Lines (CMSL)
Conrail Shared Assets Operations (CSAO)
New Jersey Transit Rail Operations (NJT) (Atlantic City Line)
PATCO Speedline (DRPA)
SMS Rail Service (SMS)
Southern Railroad of New Jersey (SRNJ)
Winchester and Western Railroad (WW)

See also 

List of Pennsylvania-Reading Seashore Lines passenger trains
Atlantic City Railroad
Atlantic City Express Service
Central Railroad of New Jersey
Delair Bridge
New Jersey Southern Railroad
PATCO Speedline
Pennsylvania Railroad
Reading Company
Shore Fast Line
1922 Winslow Junction Train Derailment
1896 Atlantic City rail crash

References

Further reading 
Trans-Anglo Books By Rail to the Boardwalk (1986) Richard M. Gladulich 
West Jersey Chapter-NRHS West Jersey Rails (1983) NRHS
West Jersey Chapter-NRHS West Jersey Rails II (1985) NRHS
West Jersey Chapter-NRHS West Jersey Rails III (2002) NRHS
Crusader Press Pennsylvania-Reading Seashore Lines (1980) 
West Jersey Chapter-NRHS The Reading Seashore Lines (2007) Library of Congress Control Number 2005936161
West Jersey Chapter-NRHS Atlantic City Railroad (1980) Library of Congress Control Number 77-79997
West Jersey Chapter-NRHS The Philadelphia Marlton and Medford Railroad Co. 1881 - 1931 (1973)
West Jersey Chapter-NRHS The Trains to America's Playground (1988) Morning Sun Books Inc.
Morning Sun Books Inc Pennsylvania-Reading Seashores Lines In Color (1996)  
Morning Sun Books Inc Pennsylvania-Reading Seashores Lines In Color II (2009) . 
Robert Stanton The Railroads of Camden New Jersey (2006)
Robert Stanton Trolley Days in Camden New Jersey (2004)

External links 
Your # 1 source of Southern New Jersey Railroad History on the Internet!
Pennsylvania-Reading Seashore Lines Historical Society
Pennsylvania-Reading Seashore Lines EQUIPMENT ROSTER
Seashore Lines Reading Company 1954 Freight Shippers' Guide - Pennsylvania-Reading Seashore Lines
PRSL Photos
PRSL Baldwin Diesels Photos

 
Companies affiliated with the Pennsylvania Railroad
Companies affiliated with the Reading Company
Defunct New Jersey railroads
Former Class I railroads in the United States
Railroads transferred to Conrail
Railway companies established in 1933
Railway companies disestablished in 1976
Transportation in Camden County, New Jersey
Spin-offs of the Pennsylvania Railroad
American companies established in 1933